KRJM is a radio station airing an oldies format, licensed to Mahnomen, Minnesota, broadcasting on 101.5 FM.  KRJM is owned by R&J Broadcasting, Inc.

References

External links

Oldies radio stations in the United States
Radio stations in Minnesota